Seb Fontaine (born Jean-Sebastien Douglas Fontaine; 14 July 1970) is an English electronic music producer and DJ.

Biography
Fontaine had his first DJ gig at Crazy Larry's on the Kings Road, London, but he soon progressed to residency at the Fridge in Brixton in 1989.

Having worked at various other clubs in London (Subteranea, Billion Dollar Babes), he eventually became a resident DJ at one of the UK's largest club nights at Cream, and also went on to feature at its Ibiza nights.

In 2000, he joined BBC Radio 1 as a specialist dance DJ, hosting a weekly show, as well as broadcasts from Radio 1 outside broadcasts in Ibiza, before leaving in 2004.

He has also released a number of records, predominantly mix albums, and acted as a remix producer on tracks including the Outhere Brothers. He is also associated with the brand Type which he has used for naming both club nights and album releases.

Discography

Albums
1999: Prototype
1999: Prototype, Vol. 2
2000: Prototype, Vol. 3
2001: Prototype, Vol. 4
2002: Horizons
2003: Perfecto Presents: Seb Fontaine
2004: Perfecto Presents: Type
2007: Type Vol. 2

Mixed compilations
1995: A Retrospective of House '91 - '95, Vol. 2
1996: Ministry of Sound Presents: One Half of a Whole Decade
1997: An Introspective of House: 1st Dimension
1997: An Introspective of House: 2nd Dimension
1997: An Introspective of House: Platinum
1998: Various - Elements (1st Testament) Mixed by Seb fontaine and Tony De Vit
1998: Cream Anthems1999: Cream Ibiza: Departures2000: Cream Resident2001: Creamfields''

References

External links
 
 
 

1970 births
Club DJs
English radio DJs
English dance musicians
English house musicians
English record producers
Living people
People educated at Mill Hill School
DJs from London
People from Hammersmith
Progressive house musicians
Electronic dance music DJs